Fluid statics or hydrostatics is the branch of fluid mechanics that studies the condition of the equilibrium of a floating body and submerged body "fluids at hydrostatic equilibrium and the pressure in a fluid, or exerted by a fluid, on an immersed body".

It encompasses the study of the conditions under which fluids are at rest in stable equilibrium as opposed to fluid dynamics, the study of fluids in motion. Hydrostatics is a subcategory of fluid statics, which is the study of all fluids, both compressible or incompressible, at rest.

Hydrostatics is fundamental to hydraulics, the engineering of equipment for storing, transporting and using fluids.  It is also relevant to geophysics and astrophysics (for example, in understanding plate tectonics and the anomalies of the Earth's gravitational field), to meteorology, to medicine (in the context of blood pressure), and many other fields.

Hydrostatics offers physical explanations for many phenomena of everyday life, such as why atmospheric pressure changes with altitude, why wood and oil float on water, and why the surface of still water is always level and horizontal whatever the shape of its container.

History

Some principles of hydrostatics have been known in an empirical and intuitive sense since antiquity,  by the builders of boats, cisterns, aqueducts and fountains.  Archimedes is credited with the discovery of Archimedes' Principle, which relates the buoyancy force on an object that is submerged in a fluid to the weight of fluid displaced by the object. The Roman engineer Vitruvius warned readers about lead pipes bursting under hydrostatic pressure.

The concept of pressure and the way it is transmitted by fluids was formulated by the French mathematician and philosopher Blaise Pascal in 1647.

Hydrostatics in ancient Greece and Rome

Pythagorean Cup

The "fair cup" or Pythagorean cup, which dates from about the 6th century BC, is a hydraulic technology whose invention is credited to the Greek mathematician and geometer Pythagoras. It was used as a learning tool.

The cup consists of a line carved into the interior of the cup, and a small vertical pipe in the center of the cup that leads to the bottom. The height of this pipe is the same as the line carved into the interior of the cup. The cup may be filled to the line without any fluid passing into the pipe in the center of the cup. However, when the amount of fluid exceeds this fill line, fluid will overflow into the pipe in the center of the cup. Due to the drag that molecules exert on one another, the cup will be emptied.

Heron's fountain

Heron's fountain is a device invented by Heron of Alexandria that consists of a jet of fluid being fed by a reservoir of fluid. The fountain is constructed in such a way that the height of the jet exceeds the height of the fluid in the reservoir, apparently in violation of principles of hydrostatic pressure. The device consisted of an opening and two containers arranged one above the other. The intermediate pot, which was sealed, was filled with fluid, and several cannula (a small tube for transferring fluid between vessels) connecting the various vessels. Trapped air inside the vessels induces a jet of water out of a nozzle, emptying all water from the intermediate reservoir.

Pascal's contribution in hydrostatics

Pascal made contributions to developments in both hydrostatics and hydrodynamics. Pascal's Law is a fundamental principle of fluid mechanics that states that any pressure applied to the surface of a fluid is transmitted uniformly throughout the fluid in all directions, in such a way that initial variations in pressure are not changed.

Pressure in fluids at rest
Due to the fundamental nature of fluids, a fluid cannot remain at rest under the presence of a shear stress.  However, fluids can exert pressure normal to any contacting surface.  If a point in the fluid is thought of as an infinitesimally small cube, then it follows from the principles of equilibrium that the pressure on every side of this unit of fluid must be equal.  If this were not the case, the fluid would move in the direction of the resulting force.  Thus, the pressure on a fluid at rest is isotropic; i.e., it acts with equal magnitude in all directions.  This characteristic allows fluids to transmit force through the length of pipes or tubes; i.e., a force applied to a fluid in a pipe is transmitted, via the fluid, to the other end of the pipe. This principle was first formulated, in a slightly extended form, by Blaise Pascal, and is now called Pascal's law.

Hydrostatic pressure

In a fluid at rest, all frictional and inertial stresses vanish and the state of stress of the system is called hydrostatic. For a barotropic fluid in a conservative force field like a gravitational force field, the pressure exerted by a fluid at equilibrium becomes a function of force exerted by gravity.

The hydrostatic pressure can be determined from a control volume analysis of an infinitesimally small cube of fluid. Since pressure is defined as the force exerted on a test area (with : pressure, : force normal to area , : area), and the only force acting on any such small cube of fluid is the weight of the fluid column above it, hydrostatic pressure can be calculated according to the following formula:

where
  is the hydrostatic pressure (Pa),
  is the fluid density (kg/m3),
  is gravitational acceleration (m/s2),
  is the test area (m2),
  is the height (parallel to the direction of gravity) of the test area (m),
  is the height of the zero reference point of the pressure (m).

For water and other liquids, this integral can be simplified significantly for many practical applications, based on the following two assumptions. Since many liquids can be considered incompressible, a reasonable good estimation can be made from assuming a constant density throughout the liquid. The same assumption cannot be made within a gaseous environment. Under these circumstances, the integral is simplified into the formula

where  is the height  of the liquid column between the test volume and the zero reference point of the pressure. This formula is often called Stevin's law. Note that this reference point should lie at or below the surface of the liquid. For example, the absolute pressure compared to vacuum is

This can easily be visualized using a pressure prism.

Hydrostatic pressure has been used in the preservation of foods in a process called pascalization.

Medicine

In medicine, hydrostatic pressure in blood vessels is the pressure of the blood against the wall. It is the opposing force to oncotic pressure.

Atmospheric pressure
Statistical mechanics shows that, for a pure ideal gas of constant temperature in a gravitational field, T, its pressure, p will vary with height, h, as

where
  is the acceleration due to gravity
  is the  absolute temperature
  is Boltzmann constant
  is the mass of a single molecule of gas
  is the pressure
  is the height

This is known as the barometric formula, and maybe derived from assuming the pressure is hydrostatic.

If there are multiple types of molecules in the gas, the partial pressure of each type will be given by this equation. Under most conditions, the distribution of each species of gas is independent of the other species.

Buoyancy

Any body of arbitrary shape which is immersed, partly or fully, in a fluid will experience the action of a net force in the opposite direction of the local pressure gradient. If this pressure gradient arises from gravity, the net force is in the vertical direction opposite that of the gravitational force.  This vertical force is termed buoyancy or buoyant force and is equal in magnitude, but opposite in direction, to the weight of the displaced fluid.  Mathematically,

In the case of a ship, for instance, its weight is balanced by pressure forces from the surrounding water, allowing it to float. If more cargo is loaded onto the ship, it would sink more into the water – displacing more water and thus receive a higher buoyant force to balance the increased weight.

Discovery of the principle of buoyancy is attributed to Archimedes.

Hydrostatic force on submerged surfaces
The horizontal and vertical components of the hydrostatic force acting on a submerged surface are given by the following formula:

where
  is the pressure at the centroid of the vertical projection of the submerged surface
  is the area of the same vertical projection of the surface
  is the density of the fluid
  is the acceleration due to gravity
  is the volume of fluid directly above the curved surface

Liquids (fluids with free surfaces)
Liquids can have free surfaces at which they interface with gases, or with a vacuum. In general, the lack of the ability to sustain a shear stress entails that free surfaces rapidly adjust towards an equilibrium. However, on small length scales, there is an important balancing force from surface tension.

Capillary action
When liquids are constrained in vessels whose dimensions are small, compared to the relevant length scales, surface tension effects become important leading to the formation of a meniscus through capillary action. This capillary action has profound consequences for biological systems as it is part of one of the two driving mechanisms of the flow of water in plant xylem, the transpirational pull.

Hanging drops
Without surface tension, drops would not be able to form. The dimensions and stability of drops are determined by surface tension. The drop's surface tension is directly proportional to the cohesion property of the fluid.

See also

References

Further reading

External links

 

 
Pressure
Underwater diving physics